Glipa dohertyi is a species of beetle in the genus Glipa. It was described in 1932.

References

dohertyi
Beetles described in 1932